Herbertia may refer to:
 Herbertia (plant), a plant genus in the family Iridaceae
 Herbertia (wasp), a wasp genus in the family Pteromalidae
 Herbertia (journal) An international journal published by the International Bulb Society devoted to the botany and horticulture of geophytic plants with a special emphasis on the Amaryllidaceae and other petaloid monocot families rich in bulbous or cormous plants. it was named in honour of William Herbert.

References